An oak forest is a forest where the trees are predominantly oaks.

Oak Forest may refer to the following places:

Settlements
Oak Forest, Illinois, a suburban city in Cook County
Oak Forest, Houston, a residential community in northwest Houston, Texas
Oak Forest, Indiana, an unincorporated community in Franklin County
Oak Forest, Texas, a ghost town in Gonzales County
Oak Forest, Virginia, an unincorporated community in Cumberland County

Other
Oak Forest (Mechanicsville, Virginia), a historic home
Oak Forest (Metra station), a railway station in Oak Forest, Illinois
 Twangste ('Oak Forest'), Old Prussian fort and settlements which became Königsberg